Ruins of Adventure is a Dungeons & Dragons module that served as the basis for the popular "Gold Box" role-playing video game Pool of Radiance, published in 1988 by Strategic Simulations, Inc. (SSI). According to the editors of Dragon magazine, Pool of Radiance was based on Ruins of Adventure, and not vice versa. The plot loosely tracks that of the computer game.

Plot summary
Ruins of Adventure contains four short Forgotten Realms adventure scenarios which are connected and adapted from the Pool of Radiance computer game, and take place in the devastated town of Phlan.

The adventurers are hired to remove evil forces from Phlan, presumably by killing them. They hear rumor of a Boss controlling them and seek him out. This Boss proves to be a worthy adversary, but in the end the adventurers defeat him.

Locations
There are various locations in the fictional city of Phlan. Each of these locations comes with a map and detailed area description. These locations include:
 Kovel Mansion
 The Slum District
 The Temple of Bane
 Kuto's Well
 Mantor's Library
 Stojanow Gate
 Podol Plaza
 The Cadorna Textile House
 Valhingen Graveyard
 Valjevo Castle
 Sorcerer's Island
 Zhentil Keep Outpost

Pre-generated characters
There are numerous pre-generated characters in this book. Monsters each have their own stats prepared and there are quite a few non-player characters.

Publication history
Ruins of Adventure was written by James Ward, David "Zeb" Cook, Steve Winter, and Mike Breault, with a cover by Clyde Caldwell, and was published by TSR in 1988 as a 96-page book.

Reception

References

Forgotten Realms adventures
Role-playing game supplements introduced in 1988